The 2020 Staysure Tour was scheduled to be the 29th season of the European Senior Tour, the professional golf tour for men aged 50 and above operated by the PGA European Tour. The season was officially titled as the Staysure Tour under a sponsorship agreement with UK-based insurance company Staysure.

On 19 June, the PGA European Tour announced that the entire 2020 season would be cancelled due to the COVID-19 pandemic.

Qualifying school
The qualifying school was played in Portugal in late January 2020. There were two 36-hole "stage 1" events with the leading players in these events joining a number of exempt players in the 72-hole final stage. There were five qualifying places available for the 2020 season.

The following five players gained their places on the 2020 tour:

Suneson beat Victor Casado and Gary Marks with a birdie at the first playoff hole.

References

External links 

 

European Senior Tour
European Senior Tour